Frederick Forsyth Presents is a series of British made-for-television films made by FremantleMedia for London Weekend Television on ITV, first broadcast between 2 December 1989 to 8 December 1990.

Based on stories which were later published as the Forsyth novel The Deceiver, there are six films, most with the themes of espionage and war. An important character who appears in all six is Sam McCready, played by Alan Howard, a Secret Intelligence Service agent who has become an author but continues to work on SIS operations. He plays the lead in most of the films, but in A Little Piece of Sunshine he has more of a supporting role. Each of the stories are introduced on screen by Frederick Forsyth.

Outline
Sam McCready is an experienced SIS field agent who believes in his way of doing things, which is no longer welcome in some quarters. Set in areas of international tension around the world, including the Middle East, Berlin, and the West Indies, the films highlight a division in British espionage and government between those who favour a subservient British relationship with the American Central Intelligence Agency and those, including McCready, who want to see more independence of thought and action. There is also a tension between the protagonists of Signals intelligence, or Sigint, intelligence from electronic interception and satellite observation, and Human intelligence, or Humint, intelligence from agents in the field. The series mocks the subservient camp and those who are over-awed by technology, as well as more gently finding fault with the CIA.

Production
In 1988 Frederick Forsyth secured a contract with London Weekend Television for six thrillers under the headline name of Frederick Forsyth Presents, with a book to be linked to the series, which came out in 1991 as The Deceiver.

The first three episodes were filmed, and the launch of the series was fixed for December 1989. In the run-up to that, the producers said they were hoping to attract eight million television viewers.

Films

See also
1989 in British television

Notes

External links
A Casualty of War at IMDb
Just Another Secret at IMDb
Pride and Extreme Prejudice at IMDb
A Little Piece of Sunshine at IMDb
Death Has a Bad Reputation at IMDb
The Price of the Bride at IMDb
Elizabeth Hurley in Death Has a Bad Reputation (1990) at YouTube

Frederick Forsyth
1989 British television series debuts
1990 British television series endings
1980s British drama television series
1990s British drama television series
British television films
ITV television dramas
Espionage television series
British thriller television series
1980s British anthology television series
1990s British anthology television series
Television series by ITV Studios
Television series by Fremantle (company)
London Weekend Television shows
English-language television shows
Films scored by Paul Chihara